Guo Yuhuai (born October 1934) is a People's Republic of China politician. He was born in Xiaoyi, Shanxi. He graduated from Shanxi University. He was vice-governor and CPPCC Committee Chairman of his home province.

References

1934 births
People's Republic of China politicians from Shanxi
Chinese Communist Party politicians from Shanxi
Vice-governors of Shanxi
CPPCC Committee Chairmen of Shanxi
Shanxi University alumni
Living people
Politicians from Lüliang